Miranda is a town and municipality in the Cauca Department, Colombia.

History
It was on May 7, 1899 when Don Julio Fernández Medina founded the city, since then the community mixed among Afro-Descendant, Indigenous people, Mulattoes and from different regions have built one of the most prosperous towns in the department. Today Miranda has strengths in the agroindustrial field, and growth in the tourism sector, because the natural wealth framed in its rivers, makes natural spas suitable for national and foreign tourists. 
Precisely in this year – towards the month of October – the War of the Thousand Days broke out, that lived in the Municipality of Miranda, it was known with the name of Revolution of the Manigua, according to narration of the caloteño historian Mariano Sendoya.

References

Municipalities of Cauca Department